Bellerose is a middle class neighborhood on the eastern edge of the New York City borough of Queens, along the border of Queens and Nassau County, Long Island. It is adjacent to Bellerose Village and Bellerose Terrace in Nassau County, from which it is separated by Jericho Turnpike. The northern edge of Bellerose is separated from another part of the Nassau border by the neighborhood of Floral Park, Queens to the east, divided by Little Neck Parkway.

The neighborhood consists predominantly of detached houses with mostly Indian American, European American, and working and middle class populations. While the northeastern section of Queens Village is sometimes referred to as part of Bellerose, it is also called Bellerose Manor, which is recognized by the U.S. Postal Service as an "acceptable alternate" to Queens Village and Jamaica in postal addresses.

Bellerose is located in Queens Community District 13 and its ZIP Code is 11426. It is patrolled by the New York City Police Department's 105th Precinct.

Demographics
Based on data from the 2010 United States Census, the population of Bellerose was 25,287, an increase of 823 (3.4%) from the 24,464 counted in 2000.

The racial makeup of the neighborhood was 31.5% (7,974) White, 7.4% (1,882) African American, 0.2% (61) Native American, 38.8% (9,821) Asian, 0.2% (41) Pacific Islander, 2.0% (494) from other races, and 3.7% (936) from two or more races. Hispanic or Latino of any race were 16.1% (4,078) of the population.

Education
Bellerose's public schools are operated by the New York City Department of Education.  It is mostly part of District 26 but some areas are in District 29. The neighborhood's nearest high school is Martin Van Buren High School in Queens Village.

The Queens Public Library operates the Bellerose branch at 250-06 Hillside Avenue.

Transportation
The  bus on Little Neck Parkway on runs on weekdays. The  bus on Braddock Avenue. Hillside Avenue, Jamaica Avenue, and Union Turnpike are the major east–west arteries. The Cross Island Parkway serves as the major north–south artery.

The closest railroad stations are the Bellerose station and the Elmont station, located outside the city limits on the Hempstead Branch of the Long Island Rail Road.

Notable people
 Ted Alexandro (born 1969), stand-up comedian.
 Evan Handler (born 1961), actor
 Heems (born 1985), rapper
 Jack Rohan (1931-2004), college basketball player and coach, who was head coach of the Columbia Lions men's basketball team.
 Lynne Stewart (1939-2017), defense attorney who was known for representing controversial defendants.
 Shannon Tavarez (1999-2010), Broadway actress; advocate for bone-marrow donation.

References

External links 

The Creedmoor Civic Association
Rocky Hill Civic Association
Bellerose Commonwealth Civic Association
Bellerose Hillside Civic Association

Neighborhoods in Queens, New York